The 1936 SMU Mustangs football team represented Southern Methodist University (SMU) as a member of the Southwest Conference (SWC) during the 1936 college football season. Led by second-year head coach Matty Bell, the Mustangs compiled an overall record of 5–4–1 with a mark of 2–3–1 in conference play, plaching fifth in the SWC. The team played home games at Ownby Stadium in Dallas.

Entering the season as defending co-national champion, SMU had high expectations once again. They lost their first regular season game in two years when were deafeated by Fordham at the Polo Grounds. Nonetheless, SMU was ranked 19th in first ever AP Poll, released two weeks later, on October 19.

Schedule

Rankings

References

SMU
SMU Mustangs football seasons
SMU Mustangs football